Deadline (also known as Anatomy of a Horror) is a 1980 Canadian horror film directed and co-written by Mario Azzopardi and starring Stephen Young and Sharon Masters.

Cast
 Stephen Young as Steven Lessey
 Sharon Masters as Elizabeth Lessey
 Marvin Goldhar as Burt Horowitz
 Jeannie Elias as Darlene Winters
 Cindy Hinds as Sharon Lessey
 Phillip Leonard as Philip Lessey
 Tod Woodcroft as David Lessey
 Bev Marsh as Martha Lessey

Release
Though shot in mid - late 1979, the earliest known verifiable listing of the film's release year is in the publication Horror and Science Fiction Films II by Donald C. Willis, copyrighted in 1982; in it, the film's release year is listed as "1980?". Home video distributor Vinegar Syndrome lists the film's release year with more certainty as 1980. Several other sources list the film's release year as 1980. In a 1985 volume of The Motion Picture Guide, the film's release date is listed as 1984. However, according to Canadian Film and Video: A Bibliography and Guide to the Literature, published in 1997, the film was released in 1979.

Home media
The film was released on Blu-ray and DVD by Vinegar Syndrome in March 2020.

Notes

References

External links
 

1980 horror films
1980 films
Canadian horror films
English-language Canadian films
Films about writers
1980s English-language films
Films directed by Mario Philip Azzopardi
1980s Canadian films